Herve Guilliod (born November 18, 1956 in Port-au-Prince) is a retired Haitian soccer forward who played in both the American Soccer League and Major Indoor Soccer League.

He graduated from Fredonia State University where he had played soccer from 1973 to 1976.  In 1977, the New York Eagles of the American Soccer League drafted Guilliod.  He spent two seasons with the Eagles, one season with the New York Apollo in 1979, then moved indoors with the Hartford Hellions of the Major Indoor Soccer League in the fall of 1979.  He later played for the Buffalo Stallions.  On August 2, 1984, the Dallas Sidekicks purchased Guilliod's contract from the Stallions. He scored the first-ever regular season goal in Sidekicks' history.  After being released from the Sidekicks on March 7, 1985, Guilliod played for the Fort Lauderdale Sun in the United Soccer League.  He also became a coach in the Garland, Texas area.  He founded the Garland Strikers youth club in 1994. He remains there today as President, Coaching Director, and Head Coach of the '07 Girls team North Texas Strikers 07G Blue.

References

External links
Dallas Sidekicks player profile
MISL stats

1956 births
Sportspeople from Port-au-Prince
American Soccer League (1933–1983) players
Buffalo Stallions players
Chicago Horizons players
Dallas Sidekicks (original MISL) players
Expatriate soccer players in the United States
Fort Lauderdale Sun players
Haitian footballers
Haitian expatriate footballers
Haitian expatriate sportspeople in the United States
Hartford Hellions players
Major Indoor Soccer League (1978–1992) players
New York Eagles players
New York Apollo players
United Soccer League (1984–85) players
Living people
All-American men's college soccer players
Association football forwards